1,2-Bis(dichlorophosphino)ethane is an organophosphorus compound with the formula (CH2PCl2)2.  A colorless liquid, it is a precursor to chelating diphosphines.

Synthesis and reactions
It is prepared by the reaction of ethylene, white phosphorus, and phosphorus trichloride:
3 C2H4  +  0.5 P4  +  4 PCl3  →   3 (CH2PCl2)2
The compound reacts with Grignard reagents and secondary amines to give chelating ligands. An often practiced use of this compound is the synthesis of 1,2-bis(dimethylphosphino)ethane.

Related compounds
1,2-Bis(dichlorophosphino)benzene

References

Phosphines
1,2-Ethanediyl compounds